Zouma is a village in the province of Nayala in Burkina Faso. 
Zouma has a population of 2,964.

References

Nayala Province
Populated places in the Boucle du Mouhoun Region